The 1995 Okinawa rape incident occurred on September 4, 1995, when three U.S. servicemen, U.S. Navy Seaman Marcus Gill and U.S. Marines Rodrico Harp and Kendrick Ledet, all serving at Camp Hansen on Okinawa, rented a van and kidnapped a 12-year-old Okinawan girl . They beat her, duct-taped her eyes and mouth shut, and bound her hands. Gill and Harp then raped her, while Ledet claimed he only pretended to do so due to fear of Gill. The offenders were tried and convicted in Japanese court by Japanese law, in accordance with the U.S.–Japan Status of Forces Agreement. The families of the defendants initially claimed that Japanese officials had racially discriminated against the men because they were all African American and coerced confessions from them, but later retracted the claims. The incident led to further debate over the continued presence of U.S. forces in Japan among Okinawans.

Reaction
Photographs of the suspects' faces have been virtually absent from Japan's media. News executives were concerned that public anger over the rape would be further inflamed and take on racist overtones if the race of the suspects were widely publicized. A US military public-affairs officer, speaking from the US military's Japan headquarters at Yokota, says he cannot disclose the suspects' races out of respect for their privacy.  

After the incident became known, public outrage began, especially over the U.S.–Japan Status of Forces Agreement, which gives the U.S. service members a certain measure of extraterritoriality (exemption from jurisdiction of local law) only as it relates to the place the suspects were detained. While the crime was committed away from a U.S. military base, the U.S. initially took the men into custody, on September 6. Although false rumors spread that the suspects were free to roam the base and had been seen eating hamburgers, the suspects were in fact held in a military brig until the Japanese officials charged them with the crime. Despite an immediate request by Japanese law enforcement for custody and eventual trial, the men were only transferred on September 29, after the Japanese had formally indicted them. This delay was in conformity with the Status of Forces agreement, which states, "The custody of an accused member of the United States armed forces or the civilian component over whom Japan is to exercise jurisdiction shall, if he is in the hands of the United States, remain with the United States until he is charged." Although the military drove the suspects to police headquarters in Naha for daily interrogations, the SOFA provision and the delay in transferring the suspects increased the outrage due to the attack, causing surge of Anti-American sentiment among Okinawans and Japanese in general.  

The Okinawa Prefectural Assembly passed a resolution to protest against the actions of the U.S. military. On October 21, a rally was held in Ginowan City to protest the incident and the US military bases. About 85,000 residents participated in the rally, including the Governor of Okinawa Masahide Ota. This was the largest protest in Okinawa since the treaty was signed in 1960. The then governor of Okinawa Masahide Ota even refused to sign the documents required by the US military base.

As a consequence of the protests regarding jurisdiction, the U.S. made concessions and agreed to consider transferring suspects to the Japanese before an indictment if the severity of the alleged crime warranted it. This agreement was decided at an emergency meeting between U.S. President Bill Clinton and Japanese Prime Minister Ryutaro Hashimoto. The people of Okinawa also placed a full-page advertisement in The New York Times decrying the rape and other aspects of the U.S. bases in Okinawa. In 1996, the United States and Japan signed a bilateral agreement to reduce the amount of land on Okinawa covered by U.S. bases by 21 percent—the U.S. military had previously occupied 19 percent of the island.

U.S. Navy Admiral Richard C. Macke was the commander of United States Pacific Command at the time of the attack. At a press conference during November 1995, Macke said of the men's actions: "I think it was absolutely stupid. I have said several times: for the price they paid to rent the car [used in the crime], they could have had a girl [prostitute]." These remarks were condemned as insensitive, and Macke was dismissed from his post and forced into early retirement. He was also reduced in rank to rear admiral (two-star) from full admiral (four-star), which reduced his pension from US$7,384/month to US$5,903/month.

Trial
Gill pleaded guilty to the rape, and the other two men pleaded guilty to conspiracy.  The trial concluded in March 1996.

Prosecutors had asked for the maximum sentences for the men, 10 years each. The judge sentenced Gill and Harp to seven years' imprisonment; Ledet received six and a half years. Their families also paid monetary reparation to the family of the victim, a common practice in Japan.

Aftermath
The three men served prison terms in Japanese prisons and were released during 2003 and then given Other Than Honorable discharge from the military. After release, Rodrico Harp decried prison conditions in Japan and said that the electronics assembly prison labor he was forced to do amounted to slave labor.

Ledet, who had claimed he did not rape the girl, died in 2006 in an apparent murder–suicide in the United States. He was found in the third-floor apartment of Lauren Cooper, a junior Kennesaw State University student and acquaintance whom he had apparently raped and murdered by strangulation. He then ended his own life by using a knife to slice open his veins at the elbows.

In 2008, a movie named The First Breath of Tengan Rei based on the Okinawa incident was released.

During December 2011 then-Defense Minister Yasuo Ichikawa was the subject of a censure motion from the opposition Liberal Democratic Party for failing to know the details of the rape. This followed his subordinate Satoshi Tanaka speaking with reporters in a tavern and using euphemisms for rape to discuss relocating the US Futenma airbase. Satoshi Tanaka was terminated as director of the Okinawa Defense Bureau, and in the cabinet reshuffle of January 13, 2012, Ichikawa was replaced by Naoki Tanaka.

See also
Rape during the occupation of Japan
Sexual assault in the U.S. military
1945 Katsuyama killing incident
1955 Yumiko-chan incident
2002 Okinawa Michael Brown incident

References

1995 crimes in Japan
Child sexual abuse in Japan
Gang rape in Asia
Japan–United States relations
Politics of Japan
United States military scandals
United States Marine Corps in the 20th century
United States Armed Forces in Okinawa Prefecture
Rape in Japan
Sex gangs
Incidents of violence against girls
Anti-Americanism
Anti-Japanese sentiment